The women's long jump at the 1954 European Athletics Championships was held in Bern, Switzerland, at Stadion Neufeld on 26 August 1954.

Medalists

Results

Final
26 August

Participation
According to an unofficial count, 23 athletes from 11 countries participated in the event.

 (2)
 (2)
 (1)
 (1)
 (3)
 (1)
 (3)
 (3)
 (1)
 (3)
 (3)

References

Long jump
Long jump at the European Athletics Championships
Euro